Nathan Stein (born March 28, 1992) is a Paralympic swimmer from Canada. He competes in S10 classification events.

Swimming career
Stein represented Canada at the 2012 Summer Paralympics in London, where he entered three events: the 50m and 100m freestyle (S10), the 100m butterfly and the 100m breaststroke. He made the finals of both the freestyle events, finishing fifth in the 100m, and in the 50m, his time of 23.58 saw him finish in second place to collect the silver medal.

As well as Paralympic Success, Stein has also won medals at both the World Championships and the Parapan American Games.

Personal history
Stein was born in Maple Ridge, Canada in 1992. Stein has the condition osteochondritis dissecans in one of his knees, which is bone deficiency. He has had multiple operations on his knee since first breaking it at the age of 11.

Honours
In 2012 Stein was awarded the Queen Elizabeth II Diamond Jubilee Medal.

References

External links
 
 

1992 births
Living people
Paralympic silver medalists for Canada
Paralympic swimmers of Canada
Swimmers at the 2012 Summer Paralympics
Swimmers at the 2016 Summer Paralympics
Medalists at the 2012 Summer Paralympics
S10-classified Paralympic swimmers
Canadian male freestyle swimmers
Canadian male butterfly swimmers
Medalists at the World Para Swimming Championships
Paralympic medalists in swimming
Medalists at the 2015 Parapan American Games